William Kay   (28 December 1894 – 6 January 1980) was an Anglican priest. 

Born in Blackburn, he was educated at Durham University and  ordained in 1919 after  distinguished wartime service with the Manchester Regiment.  He was a Curate at Rochdale and then Vicar  of Cresswell, Derbyshire. Later he was Rural Dean of Newark before a 25-year stint as Provost of Blackburn Cathedral.

References

1894 births
Alumni of Hatfield College, Durham
British Army personnel of World War I
Manchester Regiment officers
Companions of the Distinguished Service Order
Recipients of the Military Cross
Provosts and Deans of Blackburn
1980 deaths